Mark Allen Burke (born June 10, 1954) is a former American football defensive back in the National Football League for the Philadelphia Eagles. He played college football at West Virginia.

Burke played in one game for the 1976 Philadelphia Eagles, where he took one punt return for a total of 14 yards.

References

External links
Stats

1954 births
Living people
West Virginia Mountaineers football players
American football defensive backs
Philadelphia Eagles players
Sportspeople from Marietta, Ohio